South Carolina Highway 137 (SC 137) is a  state highway in the U.S. state of South Carolina. The highway connects Norris with rural areas of Pickens, via Six Mile.

Route description
SC 137 begins at an intersection with SC 93 (Norris Drive) in Norris, within Pickens County, where the roadway continues as East Jamison Street. It travels to the northwest and crosses over Twelve Mile Creek just north of Cateechee. In Six Mile, the highway intersects SC 133 (South Main Street). The two highways travel concurrently until Six Mile Cemetery, where SC 133 splits off onto Mt. Olivet Road. SC 137 travels to the north-northeast. It passes Six Mile Elementary School on the northeastern edge of the town. A short distance later, it meets its northern terminus, an intersection with SC 183 (Walhalla Highway).

Major intersections

See also

References

External links

SC 137 at Virginia Highways' South Carolina Highways Annex

137
Transportation in Pickens County, South Carolina